Salwa Abdullah (born 1953) is a Syrian doctor and politician who was Minister of Social Affairs and Labour in the First Hussein Arnous government.

References 

Living people
Syrian ministers of social affairs and labour
People from Idlib Governorate
21st-century Syrian women politicians
21st-century Syrian politicians
Women government ministers of Syria
Syrian physicians
1953 births